The Copa Rondônia is a tournament organized by Federação de Futebol do Estado de Rondônia in the year of 2001 to decide who would be the representative of the state at 2002 Campeonato Brasileiro Série C.

List of champions

References

Football in Rondônia